The 1896 Utah Agricultural Aggies football team was an American football team that represented Utah Agricultural College (later renamed Utah State University) during the 1896 college football season. In their second season of intercollegiate football (following a hiatus during the 1893, 1894, and 1895 seasons), the Aggies compiled a 0–1 record.

On Thanksgiving Day, November 26, 1896, the Aggies played the team from Brigham Young College in the second intercollegiate game in Utah Agricultural history. Brigham Young won by a 6-0 score. The Aggies' lineup against Brigham Young was as follows: Evans at left end; Preston Peterson at left tackle; Nelson at left guard; Webster at center; Martineau at right guard; Bunot at right tackle; Sutton at right end; Walter McLaughlin at quarterback; Willard Langton at left halfback; Ralph at right halfback; and John Bankhead at fullback.

Schedule

References

Utah Agricultural
Utah State Aggies football seasons
College football winless seasons
Utah Agricultural Aggies football